The experience machine or pleasure machine is a thought experiment put forward by  philosopher Robert Nozick in his 1974 book  Anarchy, State, and Utopia. It is an attempt to refute ethical hedonism by imagining a choice between everyday reality and an apparently preferable simulated reality.

A primary thesis of hedonism is that "pleasure is the good", which leads to the argument that any component of life that is not pleasurable does nothing directly to increase one's well-being.  This is a view held by many value theorists, but most famously by some classical utilitarians. Nozick attacks the thesis by means of a thought experiment. If he can show that there is something other than pleasure that has value and thereby increases well-being, then hedonism is defeated.

The thought experiment
Nozick asks us to imagine a machine that could give us whatever desirable or pleasurable experiences we could want. In this thought experiment, psychologists have figured out a way to stimulate a person's brain to induce pleasurable experiences that the subject could not distinguish from those he would have apart from the machine. He then asks, if given the choice, would we prefer the machine to real life?

Nozick also believes that if pleasure were the only intrinsic value, people would have an overriding reason to be hooked up to an "experience machine," which would produce favorable sensations.

Initial concerns
Who would run the machines if everyone plugs in? Nozick asks us to ignore this concern, since it does not adversely affect the thought experiment. One could simply stipulate that the machines have been so well designed as to be fail-proof.

The experiment is also open to multiple interpretations. For instance, Nozick claims that you could either map out the rest of your life in the machine before plugging in, or you could unplug periodically to choose your programming for the next cycle. While interesting, these variations do not directly affect the argument either.

The argument
The argument is along these lines:

Premise 1: If experiencing as much pleasure as we can is all that matters to us, then if we will experience more pleasure by doing x than by doing y, we have no reason to do y rather than x.
Premise 2: We will experience more pleasure if we plug into the experience machine than if we do not plug into the experience machine.
Conclusion 1: If all that matters to us is that we experience as much pleasure as we can, then we have no reason not to plug into the experience machine. (P1&P2)
Premise 3: We have reason not to plug into the experience machine.
Conclusion 2: Experiencing as much pleasure as we can is not all that matters to us. (C1&P3, by Modus tollens)

Reasons not to plug in
Nozick provides us with three reasons not to plug into the machine.

 We want to do certain things, and not just have the experience of doing them.
 "It is only because we first want to do the actions that we want the experiences of doing them."  
 We want to be a certain sort of person.
 "Someone floating in a tank is an indeterminate blob." 
 Plugging into an experience machine limits us to a man-made reality (it limits us to what we can make).
 "There is no actual contact with any deeper reality, though the experience of it can be simulated."

Additionally 
These are not quoted by Nozick himself, but rather other philosophers who have come up with or shared additional reasons.
 Status Quo Bias, humans tend to dislike change, especially when considering the thought of having to be prodded with wires.
 We would never see your real family and friends again, although unbeknownst to us.
 The concept of free will becomes murky.
 Plugging in is a form of suicide.

Argument against hedonism 
Hedonism states that the things in life worth pursuing are the highest good, or the things that will make you happiest both long term and short term. Happiness is the highest value in human life. The Experience Machine is hedonistic, and yet people still refuse to be plugged in for the reasons listed above. Therefore, a conclusion is made that being personally happy is not the greatest value everyone carries. (Lin)

Counterarguments
Psychologist and philosopher Joshua Greene says that our intuitions about the experience machine may be affected by status quo bias, and suggests reformulating the thought experiment in a form which counters this. According to his version:
 
you wake up in a plain white room. You are seated in a reclining chair with a steel contraption on your head. A woman in a white coat is standing over you. 'The year is 2659,' she explains, 'The life with which you are familiar is an experience machine program selected by you some forty years ago. We at IEM interrupt our client's programs at ten-year intervals to ensure client satisfaction. Our records indicate that at your three previous interruptions you deemed your program satisfactory and chose to continue. As before, if you choose to continue with your program you will return to your life as you know it with no recollection of this interruption. Your friends, loved ones, and projects will all be there. Of course, you may choose to terminate your program at this point if you are unsatisfied for any reason. Do you intend to continue with your program?
If we feel differently about this version of the story compared to the form that Nozick offers, according to Greene this is due to status quo bias.

A similar counterargument was raised in a paper titled If You Like It, Does It Matter If It's Real? by philosopher Felipe de Brigard. In contrast to the main experiment, De Brigard asked 72 US university undergraduates whether they would like to disconnect from the machine, arguing that they were already in it. About their "real" life, they were told one of three stories: (a) nothing; (b) that they were prisoners in a maximum security prison; or (c) that they were multimillionaire artists living in Monaco. Of those who were told nothing of their "real" lives, 54% wished to disconnect from the machine. Of those who were told they were prisoners, only 13% wished to disconnect. This implies that one's real-life quality impacts whether it is preferred to the machine. Of those told they were rich inhabitants of Monaco, half chose to disconnect, comparable to the proportion given no information about their "real" life. De Brigard attributes his findings to status quo bias. He argues that someone's decision not to step into the machine has more to do with wanting the status quo than with preference of the current life over the simulated one.

De Brigard points out that Nozick never empirically verified his third premise. Nozick never tested his claims, arguing instead that it must naturally be the case. Later philosophers and psychologists then matched this with their own beliefs.

In fiction

The 1996 novel Infinite Jest by David Foster Wallace involves a similar formulation of the experience machine. The novel revolves around a film titled Infinite Jest that is lethally pleasurable: the film is so entertaining that, once watched, the viewer will desire nothing else but to watch the film over and over. Examples of movies centering on machines capable of replaying experiences previously recorded include the 1983 film Brainstorm and the 1995 film Strange Days.

The choice between standard human life and transforming into creatures that can experience a much more intense pleasure life is also one of the main twists of the classic novel City, by Clifford Simak. In that story, as opposed to Nozick's argument, most people opt for the pleasure life, mostly because they can fully appreciate what they can gain in the process thanks to a sophisticated language method, suggesting that the terms of the choice have to be well chosen and fully understood for the experience to be significant.

It also is a running theme of the 1999 film The Matrix. Agent Smith's account of the early history of the Matrix includes the idea that humans reject a virtual reality that offers them paradise; however, later his informant  Cypher is willing to betray his colleagues because he would prefer to be reinserted into an (admittedly less perfect) Matrix as a wealthy and successful man than continue to live in the harsh realities outside the simulation. While this later version of the Matrix is not a paradise-like reality in the literal sense, it may be argued that it is a lot like a pleasure-inducing experience machine, since Cypher is given the opportunity to have a prominent position of power and wealth in this new simulation. As he says while dining at a simulated restaurant: "You know, I know this steak doesn't exist. I know that when I put it in my mouth, the Matrix is telling my brain that it is juicy, and delicious. After nine years, you know what I realize? Ignorance is bliss."A more elegant example of Nozick's experience machine, however, would be the PASIV Device as presented within Christopher Nolan's Inception.

See also
 Wirehead (science fiction), a fictional user of pleasure-inducing devices
 Brain in a vat

References

External links
 Experience Machine, Internet Encyclopedia of Philosophy.

Hyperreality
Internalism and externalism
Philosophical arguments
Thought experiments in ethics